Hebel can refer to:
An alternative transliteration of the Hebrew name of the Biblical figure Abel
Johann Peter Hebel (1760–1826), German poet
Hebel, Queensland, a town in the Shire of Balonne, Australia
A brand of aerated autoclaved concrete from CSR Limited